Jack MacDonald (born 16 May 1927) was an Australian rules footballer who played with Hawthorn in the Victorian Football League (VFL).

McDonald, from Carey Grammar originally, came to Hawthorn from Camberwell. He had initially trained with Melbourne, but Hawthorn made a claim for him as he was in their residential zone.

After finishing second to Pat Cash in the Hawthorn goal-kicking in his first season, he topped the list in 1952, with 25 goals.

References

1927 births
Australian rules footballers from Victoria (Australia)
People educated at Carey Baptist Grammar School
Hawthorn Football Club players
Camberwell Football Club players
Possibly living people